Heaps is a surname. Notable people with the surname include:

Abraham Albert Heaps (1885–1954), Canadian politician and labor leader
Adrian Heaps (born c. 1954), Canadian politician
Elizabeth Heaps, English academic and archivist
Jake Heaps (born 1991), American football player
Jay Heaps (born 1976), American soccer player
Marshall T. Heaps (died 1961), American politician
Rob Heaps, British actor
Stanley Heaps (1880–1962), English architect

See also
Heap (surname)